Sun in Your Eyes is a 1962 French romance film directed by Jacques Bourdon and starring Anna Karina.

Cast
 Anna Karina as Dagmar
 Georges Descrières as Denis
 Jacques Perrin as Frédéric
 Nadine Alari
 Charles Blavette
 Jean-Luc Godard
 Jean Rochefort

References

External links

1962 films
Films set in Corsica
1960s French-language films
French black-and-white films
1960s romance films
1960s French films